David "Davey" S. Moore (November 1, 1933 – March 25, 1963) was an American featherweight world champion boxer who fought professionally from 1953 to 1963. A resident of Springfield, Ohio, Moore was one of two world champions to share the name in the second half of the 20th century. The second, Davey Moore (born 1959), boxed during the 1980s.

Moore died on March 25, 1963, aged 29, as a result of injuries sustained in a match against Sugar Ramos.

Career highlights
Moore first gained wide attention from his performance on the 1952 U.S. Olympic boxing team, as a bantamweight amateur.

Moore made his professional debut on May 11, 1953, aged 19, beating Willie Reece by a decision in six rounds. He boxed 8 times in 1953, with a total record that year of 6 wins, 1 loss and 1 no contest.

From the beginning of his career through 1956 Moore fought a total of 29 bouts, with a total record of 22–5–1, and 1 no contest.  Beginning with his April 10, 1957 fight against Gil Cadilli, Moore had an 18-bout winning streak, ending when he lost to Carlos Morocho Hernández on March 17, 1960, with a TKO. March 14, 1960, won match against Bob Gassey in first round, as a result of the knockout, Gassey lost all but 2 teeth. It was during this period, on March 18, 1959, that Moore won the World Featherweight Title from Hogan "Kid" Bassey.  Moore retained the title through the remainder of his career, defending it successfully 5 times, and losing it to Sugar Ramos on March 21, 1963.

1952 Olympic results
Below is the record of Davey Moore, an American bantamweight boxer who competed at the 1952 Helsinki Olympics:

 Round of 32: bye
 Round of 16: defeated Egon Schidan (West Germany) by decision, 3-0
 Quarterfinal: lost to Kang Joon-Ho (South Korea) by decision, 1-2

Last fight and death
Moore was scheduled to face Cuban-Mexican Sugar Ramos in July 1962 at Dodger Stadium but a torrential typhoon-like rainstorm hit Los Angeles on the night of the fight and the fight was postponed until March 21, 1963. It was shown on national television in front of a crowd of 22,000. In the tenth round, Ramos staggered Moore with a left and then continued to pummel him with blows until he fell, striking the base of his neck on the bottom rope and injuring his brain stem.

Moore got to his feet for the eight-count and, despite Ramos' continuing attack, managed to finish the round on his feet, but the referee stopped the fight before the eleventh, and Ramos was declared the new World Featherweight Champion. Moore was able to give a clear-headed interview before he left the ring, but in the dressing room fell into a coma from which he never emerged. As Moore fought for life, Pope John XXIII made a statement calling the sport of boxing "barbaric", and "contrary to natural principles". Moore's condition deteriorated, and he died 75 hours after the fight on March 25 at 2:20 a.m. CST in White Memorial Hospital, Los Angeles. His body lay in state at a South Los Angeles funeral home on Tuesday, March 26 for 10 hours; over 10,000 people filed by to pay respects. He was buried in Ferncliff Cemetery in Springfield, Ohio.

Legacy
Bob Dylan wrote a song about Davey Moore's death, posing the question of responsibility. It is titled "Who Killed Davey Moore?" and was also sung by Pete Seeger and Graeme Allwright (in French).

Phil Ochs wrote a song titled "Davey Moore" which told the story of Davey Moore's death and placed the guilt on the managers and the boxing "money men" as well as boxing fans.

On September 21, 2013, the 50th anniversary of Moore's final fight, his hometown of Springfield, Ohio dedicated an 8 feet tall bronze statue in his honor. Located in a public green space just south of downtown near his old neighborhood, the dedication attendees included Moore's widow Geraldine and Ultiminio "Sugar" Ramos, visiting from Mexico City.

A pair of Moore's boxing gloves are on display in a Finnish restaurant Juttutupa in Helsinki, Finland (Säästöpankinranta 6). They were found during a renovation of a local boxing gym.

Moore, played by John Bosco Jr., is featured as a character in the movie The Happiest Day in the Life of Olli Mäki that won the 'Prize Un Certain Regard' in the 2016 Cannes Film Festival.

Professional boxing record

See also
Lineal championship

References

|-

Further reading

External links

 
https://www.wbaboxing.com/wba-history/world-boxing-association-history
https://boxrec.com/media/index.php/National_Boxing_Association%27s_Quarterly_Ratings:_1959
https://boxrec.com/media/index.php/National_Boxing_Association%27s_Quarterly_Ratings:_1960
https://boxrec.com/media/index.php/National_Boxing_Association%27s_Quarterly_Ratings:_1961
https://boxrec.com/media/index.php/National_Boxing_Association%27s_Quarterly_Ratings:_1962
https://boxrec.com/media/index.php/National_Boxing_Association%27s_Quarterly_Ratings:_1963

|-

|-

|-

|-

1933 births
1963 deaths
Boxers from Kentucky
Deaths due to injuries sustained in boxing
Sportspeople from Lexington, Kentucky
Sportspeople from Springfield, Ohio
Sports deaths in California
American male boxers
Olympic boxers of the United States
Boxers at the 1952 Summer Olympics
Featherweight boxers